Guy Dussaud (born 8 December 1955) is a French former professional footballer who played as a right winger. He most notably played for Nîmes, Grenoble, and Martigues.

References 

1955 births
Living people

Footballers from Nîmes
French footballers
Association football wingers
INF Vichy players
Nîmes Olympique players
Grenoble Foot 38 players
FC Martigues players
French Division 3 (1971–1993) players
Ligue 1 players
Ligue 2 players